Durrës railway station is the main railway station serving the city of Durrës in central Albania, the second most populous city of the Republic of Albania.

The station is the hub of the Albanian railway network, and is connected by rail to other cities in Albania, including the capital of Tirana, Vlorë, Elbasan and Shkodër. It is located in the city centre, close to the Port of Durrës. The station opened in 1947 with the opening of the railway line from Durrës to Peqin, the first standard-gauge railway line in Albania.

See also
List of railway stations in Albania
Rail transport in Albania
Durrës–Tiranë railway
Durrës–Vlorë railway

References

External links

 Hekurudha Shqiptare (Albanian Railways)

Buildings and structures in Durrës
Railway stations in Albania
Railway stations opened in 1949